Çekirdek ve Makara is a documentary film by Tayfun Belet made in 2015. The international name is The Reel and the Sunflower Seeds.

Synopsis
The documentary tries to capture the soul of Turkey's summer cinema concept. It shows the struggles and rewards of running one of the few old fashioned cinema businesses in Turkey. It also has glimpses of Turkey's classic cinema films and actors/actresses.

Awards
 7. TRT Documentary Awards, International Professional Category, Finalist. 2015

References

External links

2015 films
Films set in Turkey
2010s Turkish-language films
Turkish short documentary films
2015 short documentary films